Carlo Romano (8 May 1908 – 16 October 1975) was an Italian actor, voice actor and  screenwriter.

Biography
Born in Livorno, Romano was the son of actress Dina Romano and the younger brother of actor Felice Romano. Romano started his acting career on stage in 1927. During World War II, he committed himself to starring mainly in revues and he still remained active in cinema, theatre, radio and television. In 1939, Romano began his radio acting career. He appeared in 94 films between 1934 and 1975. He also wrote for 14 films between 1955 and 1975. Among his most popular films include Four Steps in the Clouds and he also portrayed composer Ruggero Leoncavallo in the film I pagliacci.

Romano was also a famous voice actor, most notably the Italian voice of Don Camillo (played by French actor Fernandel) and he was the official Italian voice of Jerry Lewis, Bob Hope and Lou Costello. Other actors he dubbed included Louis de Funès, Jack Oakie, Edward Andrews, Fred Astaire, James Cagney, Peter Lorre, Ernest Borgnine, Peter Ustinov, Eli Wallach, Rod Steiger and Lloyd Corrigan. He also teamed up with Lauro Gazzolo in the Italian dubbing of the Abbott and Costello sketches. In his animated film roles, Romano voiced several characters in the Italian dubs of Disney films. These include Jiminy Cricket in Pinocchio, The Mad Hatter in Alice in Wonderland and the Sheriff of Nottingham in Robin Hood.

Personal life
Through his marriage to actress Jone Romano, he was the stepfather of actor Aleardo Ward and the step-grandfather of voice actors Luca, Andrea and Monica Ward. He also had five children from his second marriage.

Romano died in Rome on 16 October 1975, at the age of 67.

Selected filmography

 The Last Adventure (1932) - Don Gaetano - il notaio
 Everybody's Woman (1934) - Un autista di taxi (uncredited)
 L'avvocato difensore (1935)
 Il re Burlone (1936)
 Thirteen Men and a Cannon (1936) - Uomo #4
 Under the Southern Cross (1938) - Un altro operaio della piantagione
 Giuseppe Verdi (1938) - L'uomo dei soldi
 Departure (1938) - Giulio
 L'argine (1938) - L'avvocato di John
 La voce senza volto (1939) - Maurizio Sala, il tenore
 The Sons of the Marquis Lucera (1939) - Il 'terzo' figlio
 I, His Father (1939) - Giorgio
 Le sorprese del divorzio (1939) - Champeaux
 Father For a Night (1939) - Agostino
 Follie del secolo (1939) - Carlo Benac
 Cavalleria rusticana (1939) - Bammulu
 The Silent Partner (1939) - Prado
 Bridge of Glass (1940) - Leone
 The Hussar Captain (1940)
 Senza cielo (1940) - Roberto Giannini
 Il sogno di tutti (1940) - Aldo
 A Husband for the Month of April (1941) - Giovanni
 L'elisir d'amore (1941) - Belcore
 Pia de' Tolomei (1941) - Leone
 Scampolo (1941) - Gerardo Bernini
 Oro nero (1942)
 The Adventures of Fra Diavolo (1942) - Tiburzio
 Arriviamo noi! (1942) - Il secondo gestorio del "castello delle streghe"
 Giarabub (1942) - Il maresciallo Romano
 Perdizione (1942) - Augusto
 M.A.S. (1942) - Un marinaio nella taverna
 The Taming of the Shrew (1942) - Remo
 Forbidden Music (1942) - Otello
 Sette anni di felicità (1942) - José, l'allevatore di tori
 Four Steps in the Clouds (1942) - Antonio - l'autista della corriera
 Piazza San Sepolcro (1942)
 I pagliacci (1943) - Ruggero Leoncavallo
 Redenzione (1943)
 Il treno crociato (1943) - Stefano Pucci, l'attendente
 Anything for a Song (1943)
 The Ten Commandments (1945) - (segment "Non rubare")
 Life Begins Anew (1945) - Croci
 Lettere al sottotenente (1945)
 La casa senza tempo (1945) - Giovanni
 Fuga nella tempesta (1945)
 The Adulteress (1946) - Il fattore
 Il mondo vuole così (1946) - Avvocato Verdini
 Fatal Symphony (1947)
 When Love Calls (1947) - Maestro Marconi
 Alarm Bells (1949) - Il maresciallo
 La Rosa di Bagdad (1949) - Burk - the Magician (singing voice)
 Ho sognato il paradiso (1950)
 Cavalcade of Heroes (1950) - Paolo Tassoni
 Father's Dilemma (1950) - Il tassista
 Tomorrow Is Too Late (1950) - Signor Berardi
 Strano appuntamento (1950)
 Variety Lights (1950) - Enzo La Rosa
 Beauties on Bicycles (1951) - Darelli - direttore fabbrica bicicletta
 Arrivano i nostri (1951) - Comm. Garlandi
 Toto the Third Man (1951) - Il commendatore Buttafava Borelli
 My Heart Sings (1951) - Commendator Russo
 What Price Innocence? (1952) - Don Settimio
 Torment of the Past (1952) - Marco Ferretti
 Beauties in Capri (1952) - Vittorio
 Five Paupers in an Automobile (1952) - Rodolfo
 Melody of Love (1952) - Commendator Ferrario
 Primo premio: Mariarosa (1952)
 Cats and Dogs (1952) - Don Saverio
 La domenica della buona gente (1953) - Malesci
 Le infedeli (1953) - Commendator Giovanni Azzali
 Jeunes mariés (1953) - Virgile, le coiffeur
 I vitelloni (1953) - Michele Curti
 Fermi tutti... arrivo io! (1953) - Commissario Benni
 Via Padova 46 (1953) - Narrator (uncredited)
 The Most Wanted Man (1953) - (uncredited)
 Siamo ricchi e poveri (1953) - Mr. Fortini
 Of Life and Love (1954) - Carlo Migri (segment "Marsina Stretta")
 The Beach (1954) - Luigi
 It Happened at the Police Station (1954) - Thief's victim
 A Parisian in Rome (1954) - Narrator (uncredited)
 Cardinal Lambertini (1954) - Goffredo di Pietramelara
 Tears of Love (1954)
 Accadde al penitenziario (1955) - Capo degli agenti di custodia
 Addio per sempre! (1958)
 The Friend of the Jaguar (1959) - Il commendatore
 Ciao, ciao bambina! (1959) - Remigio Marchetti - la moglie di Marchetti
 Le cameriere (1959) - Zio di Monica
 Wolves of the Deep (1959)
 Le ambiziose (1961) - Il presidente della giuria
 Carmen di Trastevere (1962) - Police Commissioner
 I due toreri (1964) - Joe Ragusa
 West and Soda (1965) - Il Cattivissimo (voice)
 Indovina chi viene a merenda? (1969) - Otto Bauer
 The Balloon Vendor (1974) - Security Guard
 Il nano e la strega (1975) - Magozio (voice)
 Mr. Rossi Looks for Happiness (1976) - Signor Rossi (voice)

Dubbing roles

Animation
Jiminy Cricket in Pinocchio
The Mad Hatter in Alice in Wonderland
Sheriff of Nottingham in Robin Hood
Buzzie the Vulture in The Jungle Book

Live action
Don Camillo in Little World of Don Camillo
Don Camillo in The Return of Don Camillo
Don Camillo in Don Camillo's Last Round
Don Camillo in Don Camillo: Monsignor
Don Camillo in Don Camillo in Moscow
Tuco Ramírez in The Good, the Bad and the Ugly
Sam Wainwright in It's a Wonderful Life

References

External links

 
 
 
 

1908 births
1975 deaths
Italian male film actors
Italian male screenwriters
Italian male stage actors
Italian male television actors
Italian male radio actors
Italian male voice actors
People from Livorno
20th-century Italian male actors
20th-century Italian screenwriters
20th-century Italian male writers